Cuddington railway station serves the village of Cuddington in Cheshire, England. It has won a number of awards for its gardens, which are maintained by local volunteers.

Facilities
The station is unstaffed, but as of 2021 has a ticket machine on the Manchester-bound platform for purchase of tickets on the day, and collection of advance purchase tickets.  Like neighbouring , the main building still stands and has been converted for private use (in this case as an art gallery).  Standard waiting shelters are provided on each platform, with train running information offered via CIS displays, timetable poster boards and a pay phone.  Step-free access is officially only possible to the Manchester-bound platform although there is a level crossing at the western end of the platform which is frequently used.

Services
The station gets one train per hour westbound to Chester and one train per hour eastbound to Manchester Piccadilly. 18 trains per day run to Chester, with 17 running towards Manchester. On Sundays, there is a two-hourly service each way, with 7 trains in each direction. The majority of services are run by Northern Class 150 trains, with some Class 156's also serving the station.

There have been repeated plans for a half-hourly service in each direction - it was a part of the 2015 franchise agreement - though this has been repeatedly delayed due to capacity constraints between Stockport and Manchester and is yet, as of January 2022, to be implemented. 

As of the December 2008 timetable, there were two additional weekday peak services to and from Stockport. On Sundays, a two-hourly service to Chester and Manchester was introduced, with the latter continuing to Southport, via Wigan Wallgate and Bolton.
Prior to the new service, trains to Manchester had not operated on Sundays since the early 1990s. Passengers had to change at Altrincham on to the Manchester Metrolink to continue their journeys. 

Services beyond Manchester were terminated in the May 2010 timetable change, with all current trains now calling at Manchester Piccadilly and no further.

Proposed future developments
As part of Northern's proposed December 2022 timetable (which focuses on additional services within the Manchester area), an additional 4 trains per day between Chester and Stockport (2 in each direction) have been proposed during peak hours on Mondays to Saturdays. These services are aimed at those who are commuting to and/or working in Manchester and Stockport. This change will increase the number of trains departing Chester on the line to 20 per day, with the number departing Stockport also increased to 20 per day. The 2 hourly Sunday service will remain the same, at 7 trains per day.

References

Further reading

External links

  Mid-Cheshire Community Rail Partnership

Railway stations in Cheshire
DfT Category F2 stations
Railway stations in Great Britain opened in 1869
Former Cheshire Lines Committee stations
Northern franchise railway stations
1869 establishments in England